Dudu Aharon (born on 23 December 1984) is a singer-songwriter, musician, and composer from Israel.

Biography

David (Dudu) Aharon was born in Kiryat Ekron, and is of Yemenite-Jewish origin. He began his musical career as a child, singing in the Har Yosef Synagogue in Kiryat Ekron. Aharon later began to perform at various clubs and events around Israel. During his national service, Aharon served in the Israel Border Police, and began performing in the Red 6 club in his free time. In 2007, after he completed his service, he released his first single, which was a success and became a hit on Mizrahi music radio programs. He produced more singles and increased his appearances at clubs and events. In 2007, he released his debut album, First Love. He subsequently released five more albums and numerous singles, becoming one of Israel's leading singers of Mizrahi Music.

In 2011, Aharon took part a television reality show called "Live in LA LA Land," in which he and five other singers sought their fortune in Los Angeles. In 2013, Aharon was the second Bachelor in HaRavak, the Israeli version of The Bachelor.

Aharon became engaged to Shir Rosenblum in 2015, a union of which his mother, Tzipporah, did not approve. After they broke up, he met accessories designer Natalie Levi (or Levy), whom he married in 2018. Shortly afterward, Levi gave birth to a daughter, Renee (or Rena), but by June 2020, their marriage was on the verge of divorce, as Levi also did not get along with Aharon's mother, as well as his manager. They reconciled, and in August 2021, announced they were expecting their second child, a daughter, who was born in January 2022 and named Tamar.

Discography

Albums

See also
Music of Israel

References

External links
 https://web.archive.org/web/20101207021029/http://charts.co.il/article.asp?id=1532
 https://web.archive.org/web/20110913230408/http://www.charts.co.il/nflash.asp?id=1045
 http://www.ynet.co.il/articles/0,7340,L-3780200,00.html

1984 births
Israeli Mizrahi Jews
Living people
People from Kiryat Ekron
21st-century Israeli male singers
Jewish Israeli musicians
Israeli people of Yemeni-Jewish descent